The  ('Vienna Giant [Ferris] Wheel'), or simply Riesenrad, is a  tall Ferris wheel at the entrance of the Prater amusement park in Leopoldstadt, the 2nd district of Austria's capital Vienna. It is one of Vienna's most popular tourist attractions, and symbolises the district as well as the city for many people. Constructed in 1897, it was the world's tallest extant Ferris wheel from 1920 until 1985.

History

The Wiener Riesenrad was designed by the British engineers Harry Hitchins and Hubert Cecil Booth and constructed in 1897 by the English engineer Lieutenant Walter Bassett Bassett (1864-1907), Royal Navy, son of Charles Bassett (1834-1908), MP, of Watermouth Castle, Devon. Its purpose was to celebrate the Golden Jubilee of Emperor Franz Josef I, and it was one of the earliest Ferris wheels ever built. Bassett's Ferris wheel manufacturing business was not a commercial success, and he died in 1907 almost bankrupt.

A permit for its demolition was issued in 1916, but because of a lack of funds with which to carry out the destruction, it survived.

It was built with 30 gondolas, but was severely damaged in World War II and when it was rebuilt only 15 gondolas were replaced.

The wheel is driven by a circumferential cable which leaves the wheel and passes through the drive mechanism under the base, and its spokes are steel cables, in tension.

Height

The  Grande Roue de Paris, constructed in 1900, was taller still. However, when the Grande Roue de Paris was demolished in 1920, the Riesenrad became the world's tallest extant Ferris wheel, and it remained so for the next 65 years, until the construction of the  Technostar in Japan in 1985.

In popular culture
 The Riesenrad appeared in the post-World War II film noir The Third Man (1949)
 The wheel is featured in the 1973 spy thriller Scorpio (1973)
 The 1987 James Bond film, The Living Daylights features scenes throughout the Prater, around the wheel, and a lengthy romantic scene on the wheel.
 The wheel appears in the novel The Star of Kazan by Eva Ibbotson
 The wheel appears in Max Ophüls' Letter from an Unknown Woman (1948).
 Scenes in  Richard Linklater's Before Sunrise (1995) were filmed around the Prater and on the wheel.
 The wheel appears in The Glass Room by Simon Mawer.
 The Riesenrad appears in the film Woman in Gold (2015), about the repatriation of a Klimt portrait stolen by the Nazis from a Jewish Viennese family.
The wheel appears in Kommissar Rex the Austrian television series
Winter City in Burnout 3: Takedown is based on Vienna and includes the Riesenrad.
The wheel is featured in the US Hallmark Channel movie Christmas in Vienna.
In the second season of the NBC TV Show: Grimm, Episode 21, "the Walking Dead" the wheel is in the background of one scene.
The wheel appears in episode 1 of the TV series Vienna Blood (2019) The Last Seance

References

External links

Ferris wheels
Amusement rides introduced in 1897
Buildings and structures in Leopoldstadt
Tourist attractions in Vienna
1897 establishments in Austria
19th-century architecture in Austria